TSV Steinbach Haiger is a German association football club from Steinbach, near Haiger, Hesse.

The club's greatest success has been to earn promotion to the tier four Regionalliga Südwest in 2015.

History
For most of its history the club was a non-descript amateur side in local football. The club had a brief spell in the Bezirksklasse in the 1980s but quickly returned to the local A- and B- Klasse.

The rise of TSV Steinbach began in the mid-2000s. After relegation from the tier eight Kreisliga A, the club spent four seasons in the Kreisliga B before starting its impressive run of five promotions in six seasons. The club won the Kreisliga B in 2009, followed by a title in the Kreisliga A in 2010. TSV Steinbach finished runners-up in the Kreisoberliga in 2010 but was still promoted, followed by another championship in 2012, now in the Gruppenliga. In the Verbandsliga Hessen-Mitte TSV's rise came to a temporary halt in 2012–13 when the club came only seventh. The following season however, 2013–14, the club won its Verbandsliga division and earned promotion to the Hessenliga for the first time.

In the 2014–15 season, TSV Steinbach played in the Hessenliga where it won another championship and earned promotion to the Regionalliga Südwest.

For the 2018–19 season, the club was renamed from TSV Steinbach to TSV Steinbach Haiger.

Current squad

Honours
The club's honours:
 Hessenliga
 Champions: 2015
 Verbandsliga Hessen-Mitte
 Champions: 2014
 Gruppenliga Gießen-Marburg
 Champions: 2012
 Kreisoberliga West
 Runners-up: 2011
 Kreisliga A Dillenburg
 Champions: 2010
 Kreisliga B Dillenburg-Nord
 Champions: 2009
 Hessian Cup
 Champions: 2018, 2020

Recent seasons
The recent season-by-season performance of the club:

With the introduction of the Regionalligas in 1994 and the 3. Liga in 2008 as the new third tier, below the 2. Bundesliga, all leagues below dropped one tier.

Key

References

External links
Official team site 
Das deutsche Fußball-Archiv  historical German domestic league tables

Football clubs in Germany
Football clubs in Hesse
Association football clubs established in 1921
1921 establishments in Germany